Wetland Park is an MTR Light Rail stop. It is located at ground level beside Wetland Park Road, between Hong Kong Wetland Park and Grandeur Terrace, in Tin Shui Wai, Yuen Long District. It began service on 7 December 2003 and belongs to Zone 5A.

References

See also

Hong Kong Wetland Park

MTR Light Rail stops
Former Kowloon–Canton Railway stations
Tin Shui Wai
Railway stations in Hong Kong opened in 2003
2003 establishments in Hong Kong